The Devil Makes Sunday is a television play about a convict break out on Norfolk Island by Bruce Stewart, who had just written Shadow of a Pale Horse.  It was based on the real life Norfolk Island convict mutinies.

It was filmed for British, US and Australian television.

It was also adapted for radio.

Plot
In 1840, the convict settlement on Norfolk Island is run by Major Childs, who likes to punish convicts before church service on Sunday. A convict called Clay breaks out of prison and holds up the prison governor and his household in their dining room. Clay demands a boat for his escape.

1960 British television version

The play was filmed in Britain as the first episode of a new ATV series called Theatre 60.

Cast
Alfred Burke as Clay
Clifford Earl as Corporal
André Morell as Major Childs
Toke Townley as Stukely
Sally Home

Reception
The London Times praised "the style of production" by director Morahan "with its powerful claustrophobic use of close up and crowded medium shot to convey something of the atmosphere of an Australian convict colony in the 1840s". The critic felt the play "was not, perhaps, always quite so good as it looked, it was interesting enough - for its documentary value if no other."

1961 US television version

The episode was filmed in the US as part of the US Steel Hour.

Plot
On the penal colony of Norfolk Island one Sunday afternoon, a convict, Prendergast, rests during working hours. He is flogged to unconsciousness.

Convict Clay along with Silverwood and Stuckeley leads an uprising. Dora Childs, daughter of the commandant, Major Childs, becomes involved.

Cast
Dane Clark as Clay
Martyn Green as Childs
Brooke Hayward as Dora Childs
Fritz Weaver as Silverwood
Chris Wiggins as Stukely
Frank Conroy as Dr McCombie
William Hansen as Graves
James Valentine as Barnaby
Jack Dengel as Prendergast
Tom Clancy as Quill

1962 Australian television version
See The Devil Makes Sunday (1962 film)

References

External links

British drama films
British television plays
1960 television plays
1961 television plays
Fiction set in 1840
Australia in fiction
American drama television films